John, Prince of Asturias and Girona (30 June 1478 – 4 October 1497), was the only son of King Ferdinand II of Aragon and Queen Isabella I of Castile, and heir-apparent to both their thrones for nearly his entire life.

Early life
John was born in Seville in 1478 the 
son of sovereigns of Castile, Isabella I and Ferdinand V (also Ferdinand II of Aragon). At the time, his parents were involved in the War of Castilian Succession against Isabella's niece Juana la Beltraneja, wife of King Afonso V of Portugal.

 
John's birth helped consolidate Isabella's position as a sovereign. At the time of his birth, he had one elder sister Isabella; his younger sisters were Joanna, Maria, and Catherine.

The Catholic monarchs won the war against the King and Queen of Portugal. To negotiate a peace settlement with Isabella, King Afonso sent Infanta Beatrice, Duchess of Viseu. The two women met in March 1479. Beatrice was Afonso's sister-in-law and Isabella's maternal aunt. By terms of the treaty they eventually negotiated, the former Queen of Portugal (her marriage having been annulled by the Pope) was given two options: she could either wed Prince John, waiting 13 or 14 years until the prince was old enough to be married (by which time Joanna herself would be at least thirty) or she could enter a convent; either way she was to give up her claim to the throne.

Childhood
Isabella I was quite an attentive mother for such a busy queen. John, being her only son, had a special place in her heart and she referred to him affectionately as ’my angel’ even when he was being reprimanded by her, John's wetnurse was Maria de Guzman, a member of the powerful Spanish House of Mendoza. It was commonly believed in the fifteenth century that a wetnurse could influence the character of the baby she breastfed; a healthy woman with a placid disposition was thus ideal.

John's paternal grandfather, King John II of Aragon, took close interest in the infant prince; he warned his son Ferdinand that the prince should not be tutored under one grandee, a member of the nobility, as they would have far too much influence over the boy. In 1492, Columbus named the newly discovered island of Cuba as Isla Juana in deference to Prince John, at that time the heir apparent.

Marriage plans
During his early years, Isabella and Ferdinand considered Princess Catherine of York, a daughter of King Edward IV of England and his wife Elizabeth Woodville, as a potential wife for John.  When he died suddenly in April 1483, Edward IV was succeeded by his minor son Edward V, but Edward IV's brother Richard III soon seized the throne. The marriage of Catherine’s parents was declared bigamous and therefore invalid, barring her and her siblings from inheriting the throne. Due to this change of power, and Catherine’s legitimacy being put into question, the marriage plans between her and John were discarded.

Isabella and Ferdinand, together with their cousin, Duke Francis II of Brittany, planned the alliance of their respective heirs, John and Anne, but the plan came to nothing, possibly due to John's frail constitution.

Isabella and Ferdinand came to plan a double alliance with Maximilian I, Holy Roman Emperor, for the marriage of his children, Archduke Philip the Handsome and Archduchess Margaret of Austria. Around the same time, King Charles VIII of France invaded Italy and marched to take Naples which belonged to a branch of the House of Trastamara. Ferdinand II was therefore against the French. With both powers angered at France, marriage was the way to seal the alliance between the two.

On 20 January 1495 in Antwerp, a preliminary alliance, which included a wedding of Prince John with Maximilian's daughter was agreed. Similarly, Maximilian's son Philip and John's sister Joanna were to be married.

Education

As heir to the throne, Isabella and Ferdinand paid special attention to John's education. His original tutor was the Dominican Fray Diego Deza who taught Theology at the University of Salamanca. Deza was also later remembered as the Grand Inquisitor of Spain, he taught the young Prince mainly in Theology as he was not a renaissance humanist. Eventually, in the late 1480s, Isabella would ask the Italian humanist Peter Martyr d'Anghiera to come and broaden the Prince's education.

Isabella also worried that John would grow up pampered and wilful if he lacked peers and companions of his own age. Therefore, she invited the sons of aristocrats to live in court. She also invited a slightly older group of young aristocrats so that her son would see older young men and that he would aspire to be more like them. Among these youths were young men who would later become famous in their own right, Nicolás de Ovando y Cáceres, the future governor of the Indies, and Gonzalo Fernández de Oviedo y Valdés the future historian of the Indies. John's education also insisted that he and his companions learned to ride and joust, to hawk and hunt, to play chess and cards, and to sing and recite poetry. John was also naturally gifted in music and was able to play the flute, violin, and the clavichord with ease and great skill. He also developed a fine tenor voice and often sang with his siblings and companions at court.

Marriage
Infanta Joanna left Spain to marry Philip the Handsome in late 1496. Philip's sister, Margaret of Austria, aged 16, married John on 3 April the following year in Burgos Cathedral. It was a good marriage and John was devoted to Margaret. All of Isabella's children had a passionate nature, and although it was a political alliance, it was a deep love match. Apparently, the amount of time they spent in bed made the court physicians uneasy about the Prince's health.  The lust he felt for his wife bothered him, but his confessor assured him it was natural. The Princess of Austria was easy to love, she was fun-loving and had a sharp sense of humour. Her first betrothal to Charles VIII ended when he rebuked her. Her engagement to the Prince of Asturias seemed doomed when the ship carrying her to Spain hit a storm in the Bay of Biscay. In haste, she wrote her own epitaph should she not reach Spain.
"Here lies Margaret, the willing bride,Twice married - but a virgin when she died."

Death

On 4 October 1497, a messenger came to John's parents and informed them that their son lay dangerously ill in Salamanca. He and his wife Margaret had arrived a week earlier, on the way to the wedding of his older sister in Portugal. At once, Ferdinand rushed to his son's bedside while Isabella remained behind fretting over the life of her only son. Ferdinand was with his son as John died in the arms of his former tutor Fray Diego Deza.

He died possibly from tuberculosis, but rumours circulated John had died of sexual over-exertion at age eighteen . His dog, a lurcher called Bruto, had whimpered as he died, then stayed next to his coffin throughout the vigil in Salamanca's main church. John's devastated mother would later keep the dog next to her, as if to keep the memory of her beloved son with her. Two months later, on 8 December, the Princess of Asturias gave birth to their only child, a stillborn girl.

Consequences
John's death was followed closely by that of his sister Isabella in 1498. Her only child, Miguel de la Paz, died in 1500. The Spanish kingdoms passed to his younger sister Joanna, her husband Philip the Handsome, and their Habsburg descendants. Philip had himself and Joanna declared as 'Princes of Castile' which her parents saw as disrespectful towards his deceased brother-in-law.

Ancestry

Notes

References

|-

House of Trastámara
Princes of Asturias
Dukes of Montblanc
Aragonese infantes
Castilian infantes
Heirs apparent who never acceded
1478 births
1497 deaths
Burials in the Community of Castile and León
Spanish people of English descent
Spanish people of Portuguese descent
Sons of kings